Szandra Pergel (born 24 December 1988) is a Hungarian table tennis player. She competed in the 2020 Summer Olympics.

On club level she competes for Panathinaikos.

References

External links
 

1988 births
Living people
Sportspeople from Budapest
Table tennis players at the 2020 Summer Olympics
Hungarian female table tennis players
Olympic table tennis players of Hungary
Panathinaikos table tennis players
European Games competitors for Hungary
Table tennis players at the 2015 European Games
Table tennis players at the 2019 European Games